Pterostylis melagramma, commonly known as the black-stripe leafy greenhood is a plant in the orchid family Orchidaceae and is endemic to south-eastern Australia. Individual plants have either a rosette of three to six leaves or a flowering spike with up to twenty flowers and five to seven stem leaves. The flowers are translucent green with faint darker green lines and have a brownish-yellow labellum with a dark stripe.

Description
Pterostylis melagramma, is a terrestrial,  perennial, deciduous, herb with an underground tuber. The dorsal sepal and petals are joined to form a hood over the column with the dorsal sepal suddenly curving downwards near its tip which is often brown. Flowering occurs from June to November.

Taxonomy and naming
Pterostylis melagramma was first formally described in 1998 by David Jones and the description was published in Australian Orchid Research. The specific epithet (melagramma) is derived from the Greek words melas, melanos meaning 'dark' or 'black' and gramme, 'line', referring to the dark stripe on the labellum.

Distribution and habitat
The black-stripe leafy greenhood is widely distributed and common in higher rainfall areas of Victoria and Tasmania and also occurs in south-eastern South Australia and southern New South Wales.

Conservation
This greenhood is classed as "endangered" in South Australia.

References

melagramma
Orchids of New South Wales
Orchids of South Australia
Orchids of Tasmania
Orchids of Victoria (Australia)
Endemic orchids of Australia
Plants described in 1998